Buckland railway station was a station on the North Island Main Trunk in New Zealand, serving the Buckland settlement south of Pukekohe.

The station opened on 20 May 1875, closed to goods on 19 December 1954, and to passengers and all traffic on 2 February 1969. It was only once considered important enough to be included in the annual returns of stations.

History 
By September 1878 Bucklands had a 6th class passenger station and in 1879 a stationmaster's house and  x  goods shed were added. There was also a shelter shed, passenger platform, cart approach to platform, loading bank, cattle yards, urinals and a passing loop for 34 wagons. About 1911 the loop was extended to 66 wagons, and in 1912 the line to Tuakau had 10 curves of 10 to  radius, reduced to three  curves, and the gradient eased from 1 in 40 to 1 in 100, at a cost of £11,000. A veranda was added in 1913. In 1897 it was noted a lamp was needed. However, in 1928  there was a complaint of the platform being too short and the station being unlit. Southern Line fares were extended to Buckland and Tuakau in 1929.

In December 1954 it was noted that the goods shed and siding would shortly be removed and by June 1955 the siding had been removed to allow doubling of the line between Paerata and Tuakau.

References

External links 
 1920s map showing location of station
 1927 photo of railway crossing and township
 2020 video of Te Huia passing through Buckland

Defunct railway stations in New Zealand
Buildings and structures in the Auckland Region
Rail transport in the Auckland Region
Railway stations opened in 1875
Railway stations closed in 1969